Tanongsak Saensomboonsuk (born 13 October 1990) is a Thai badminton player. He won his first career Superseries title by winning the Denmark Open on 23 October 2016, becoming the first Thai to win a men's singles title in a Superseries Premier tournament. He is studying for a Bachelor's degree in Business Administration at Siam University.

Achievements

Southeast Asian Games 
Men's singles

Summer Universiade 
Men's singles

BWF World Tour (2 runners-up) 
The BWF World Tour, which was announced on 19 March 2017 and implemented in 2018, is a series of elite badminton tournaments sanctioned by the Badminton World Federation (BWF). The BWF World Tour is divided into levels of World Tour Finals, Super 1000, Super 750, Super 500, Super 300 (part of the HSBC World Tour), and the BWF Tour Super 100.

Men's singles

BWF Superseries (1 title) 
The BWF Superseries, which was launched on 14 December 2006 and implemented in 2007, was a series of elite badminton tournaments, sanctioned by the Badminton World Federation (BWF). BWF Superseries levels were Superseries and Superseries Premier. A season of Superseries consisted of twelve tournaments around the world that had been introduced since 2011. Successful players were invited to the Superseries Finals, which were held at the end of each year.

Men's singles

  BWF Superseries Finals tournament
  BWF Superseries Premier tournament
  BWF Superseries tournament

BWF Grand Prix (1 title, 3 runners-up) 
The BWF Grand Prix had two levels, the Grand Prix and Grand Prix Gold. It was a series of badminton tournaments sanctioned by the Badminton World Federation (BWF) and played between 2007 and 2017.

Men's singles

  BWF Grand Prix Gold tournament
  BWF Grand Prix tournament

BWF International Challenge/Series (2 titles, 1 runner-up)
Men's singles

  BWF International Challenge tournament
  BWF International Series tournament

References

External links 
 

1990 births
Living people
Tanongsak Saensomboonsuk
Tanongsak Saensomboonsuk
Badminton players at the 2006 Asian Games
Badminton players at the 2010 Asian Games
Badminton players at the 2014 Asian Games
Tanongsak Saensomboonsuk
Asian Games medalists in badminton
Medalists at the 2010 Asian Games
Competitors at the 2009 Southeast Asian Games
Competitors at the 2011 Southeast Asian Games
Competitors at the 2013 Southeast Asian Games
Competitors at the 2015 Southeast Asian Games
Tanongsak Saensomboonsuk
Tanongsak Saensomboonsuk
Tanongsak Saensomboonsuk
Southeast Asian Games medalists in badminton
Tanongsak Saensomboonsuk
Tanongsak Saensomboonsuk
Universiade medalists in badminton
Medalists at the 2013 Summer Universiade
Medalists at the 2015 Summer Universiade